The 2019–20 Fulham F.C. season was the club's 122nd professional season and their first in the EFL Championship after their relegation from the Premier League in the 2018–19 campaign. Fulham also competed in the FA Cup and the EFL Cup. The season covered the period from 1 July 2019 to 4 August 2020.

Players

Transfers

Transfers in

Loans in

Loans out

Transfers out

Pre-season
The Cottagers announced their pre-season schedule in June 2019.

Competitions

Championship

League table

Results summary

Results by matchday

Matches
On Thursday, 20 June 2019, the EFL Championship fixtures were revealed.

Play-offs

FA Cup

The second round draw was made live on BBC Two from Etihad Stadium, Micah Richards and Tony Adams conducted the draw. The fourth round draw was made by Alex Scott and David O'Leary on Monday, 6 January.

EFL Cup

The second round draw was made on 13 August 2019 following the conclusion of all but one first round matches.

Squad statistics

Appearances and goals

|-
! colspan=14 style=background:#dcdcdc; text-align:center| Goalkeepers

|-
! colspan=14 style=background:#dcdcdc; text-align:center| Defenders

|-
! colspan=14 style=background:#dcdcdc; text-align:center| Midfielders

|-
! colspan=14 style=background:#dcdcdc; text-align:center| Forwards

|-
! colspan=14 style=background:#dcdcdc; text-align:center| Out on Loan

|-
! colspan=14 style=background:#dcdcdc; text-align:center| Left During Season

|-

Top scorers
Includes all competitive matches. The list is sorted by squad number when total goals are equal.

Last updated 4 August 2020.

References

Fulham
Fulham F.C. seasons
Fulham
Fulham